Events in the year 2022 in Suriname.

Incumbents 

 President: Chan Santokhi
 Vice President: Ronnie Brunswijk
 Speaker: Marinus Bee

Events 
Ongoing — COVID-19 pandemic in Suriname

Deaths 

 11 June – Hein Eersel, 100, academic administrator, chancellor of the University of Suriname (1968–1988)

References 

 
2020s in Suriname
Years of the 21st century in Suriname
Suriname
Suriname